Syed Abbas Haider Bilgrami (born 26 October 1989) is a Pakistani hockey player who participated in the 2008 Summer Olympics in Beijing, China.

References

External links
 

1989 births
Field hockey players at the 2008 Summer Olympics
Living people
Olympic field hockey players of Pakistan
Pakistani male field hockey players
Muhajir people
2010 Men's Hockey World Cup players
21st-century Pakistani people